OpenCola is a brand of open-source cola whose list of ingredients and preparation instructions are freely available and modifiable. Anybody can make the drink, and anyone can modify and improve on the recipe. It was launched in 2001 by free software P2P company Opencola, to promote their company.

Background

The original version 1.0 was released on 27 January 2001 by Grad Conn, Cory Doctorow, and John Henson. The current version is 1.1.3. Although originally intended as a promotional tool to explain free and open source software, the drink took on a life of its own and 150,000 cans were sold. The Toronto-based company Opencola became better known for the drink than the software it was supposed to promote. Laird Brown, the company's senior strategist, attributes its success to a widespread mistrust of big corporations and the "proprietary nature of almost everything".

Flavouring formula 

The flavouring formula for OpenCola is:

 10.0 g food-grade gum arabic
 3.5 mL orange oil
 3.0 mL water
 2.75 mL lime oil
 1.25 mL cassia oil
 1.0 mL lemon oil
 1.0 mL nutmeg oil
 0.25 mL coriander oil
 0.25 mL neroli oil
 0.25 mL lavender oil

Concentrate formula 

 2.36 kg plain granulated white table sugar
 2.28 L water
 30.0 mL caramel color
 17.5 mL (3.50 tsp.) 75% phosphoric acid or citric acid
 10.0 mL (2.00 tsp.) flavouring formula
 2.5 mL (0.50 tsp.) caffeine (optional)

Dilution 

After mixing up the concentrate to the prescribed recipe (including all recommended safety precautions), the syrup is diluted 5:1 with ("preferably sodium-free") soda water to make the finished drink; at this dilution, the above combination of ingredients will yield approximately 24 litres of OpenCola.

The full recipe also includes instructions for home-made soda water produced from basic ingredients such as yeast and sugar in order to make the entire process open source; otherwise there would be a need to use commercially produced bottled or canned soda, or consumer carbonation machines with commercially manufactured carbon dioxide canisters.

See also 

 Cube Cola
 Coca-Cola formula
 Free Beer, open source beer, formerly known as Our Beer
 List of brand name soft drinks products
 List of soft drink flavors

References

External links 

 OpenCola soft drink
 Cube-Cola, Bristol, UK
 How to Make OpenCola - WikiHow
 The recipe from Wiki-How, condensed into a single, easily printable page
 OpenSoda.org, a continuation of the OpenCola work for recipe and methodology
 OpenCola on GitHub

Cola brands
Open content projects
Food and drink introduced in 2001
Copyleft media